Güvem can refer to the following villages in Turkey:

 Güvem, Kızılcahamam
 Güvem, Mustafakemalpaşa
 Güvem, Savaştepe